HMS Sparrow was a 10-gun  built for the Royal Navy during the 1820s. She was broken up in August 1860.

Description
The ship's tonnage was 163  tons burthen. The Bramble class was armed with two 6-pounder cannon and eight 12-pounder carronades. The ships had a crew of 50 officers and ratings.

Construction and career
Sparrow, the third ship of her name to serve in the Royal Navy, was ordered on 20 March 1819, laid down in October 1827 at Pembroke Dockyard, Wales, and launched on 28 June 1828. She was commissioned on 18 July and based at Portsmouth Dockyard.

Notes

References

Bramble-class cutter
1828 ships
Ships built in Pembroke Dock